Bomb: The Race to Build—and Steal—the World's Most Dangerous Weapon is a 2012 adolescent non-fiction book by author Steve Sheinkin. The book won the 2013 Newbery Honor and Sibert Medal from the American Library Association.
This book follows the process of building the nuclear bomb by the discovery of nuclear fission by German scientist Otto Hahn on December 17, 1938.

Introduction 

The book traces the origin and development of the first atomic bomb. It follows the development of the atomic bomb from the discovery of nuclear fission through the Nazi heavy water manufacture to the Manhattan Project and the attempts of the Soviet Union to steal the bomb design, finishing at the dropping of the bombs on the cities of Nagasaki and Hiroshima Japan.

Reception
The St. Louis Post-Dispatch (Missouri) in 2013 called this the best nonfiction book of the year for young adults (YA), and said that it was a '... most distinguished informational ...' book.  Kirkus Review said "the book is a true spy thriller...It takes a lot of work to make a complicated subject clear and exciting, and from his prodigious research and storytelling skill, Sheinkin has created a nonfiction story young people will want to read."  Lisa Taylor, from School Library Journal Reviews, said that "this award-winning, meticulously sourced book deserves a spot in every library" and Brian Odom noted the extensive historical information and hard facts, concluding that Bomb was a "well-documented account. It reads like an international spy thriller, and that's the beauty of it."

Awards 

Winner of the 2013 Sibert Medal
Winner of the 2013 YALSA Award for Excellence in Nonfiction
A 2013 Newbery Medal Honor Book
2012 National Book Award Finalist for Young People's Literature

References 

2012 non-fiction books
American non-fiction books
Children's non-fiction books
Newbery Honor-winning works
Young adult non-fiction books
2012 children's books
American children's books
Books by Steve Sheinkin
Roaring Brook Press books